The 2010 Alaska gubernatorial election took place on November 2, 2010. Former Governor Sarah Palin did not run, having resigned in July 2009. Incumbent Governor Sean Parnell, who as lieutenant governor succeeded Palin following her resignation, announced that he would seek a full term.

Following the primary election on Tuesday, August 24, 2010, the Democratic ticket consists of Ethan Berkowitz and Diane E. Benson running against Republican Parnell and his running mate, Mead Treadwell. In the general election Parnell/Treadwell defeated Berkowitz/Benson by a wide margin. 

Parnell received over 59% of the vote, which is the highest percentage for any Alaska gubernatorial candidate in history. This is the only election in Alaskan history where any party won three consecutive gubernatorial elections.

Republican primary

Certified for the ballot
 Gerald L. Heikes, perennial candidate
 Merica Hlatcu
 Sam Little, truck driver and country musician
 Sean Parnell, incumbent Governor
 Ralph Samuels, former Majority Leader of the Alaska House of Representatives
 Bill Walker, attorney and former Mayor of Valdez

Declined
 Sarah Palin, former Governor
 Ted Stevens, former U.S. Senator & U.S. Attorney (ran for 2014 U.S. Senate election)

Withdrew
 John Harris, former Speaker of the Alaska House of Representatives, announced in January 2010 that he would be seeking re-election to his House seat instead

Polling

Results

Alaskan Independence-Democratic-Libertarian primary

Candidates

Alaskan Independence Party
 Don Wright, bush pilot

Democratic Party
 Ethan Berkowitz, former Minority Leader of the Alaska House of Representatives, nominee for Lieutenant Governor in 2006 and Congress in 2008
 Hollis S. French, State Senator
 Bob Poe, Businessman (Withdrawn)

Libertarian Party
 William Toien

Results

General election

Candidates
 Ethan Berkowitz (D)
 Berkowitz's running mate is college professor Diane Benson, who ran for Governor in 1998 on the Green Party ticket.
 Sean Parnell (R)
 Parnell's running mate is businessman Mead Treadwell.
 William Toien (L)
 Toien's running mate is Jeffrey Brown.
 Don Wright (AIP)
 Wright's running mate is Michigan Militia founder Norm Olson.

Lieutenant Governor Candidates

In Alaska, the lieutenant governor runs separately from the governor in the primary election. The respective party nominees for each office are then joined together as a party ticket in the general election. Occasionally, a minor party will nominate a candidate for governor, but without a running mate.

 Diane E. Benson (Democrat) (won primary)
 Eddie Burke (Republican), Anchorage businessman and radio talk show host
 Craig Campbell (Republican), incumbent (withdrew April 2010)
 Lynette Moreno-Hinz, Anchorage taxicab driver who was involved with a taxi deregulation ballot issue in 2008
 Jay Ramras (Republican), Fairbanks businessman and member of the Alaska House
 Mead Treadwell (Republican) (won primary)

Predictions

Polling

Fundraising

Campaign activity disclosure reports are filed with the Alaska Public Offices Commission. For the period ending February 1, 2010, the candidates and others subject to filing have reported the following to APOC:

Results

References

External links
Alaska Division of Elections
Alaska Governor Candidates at Project Vote Smart
Alaska Governor 2010 from OurCampaigns.com
Campaign contributions for 2010 Alaska Governor from Follow the Money
2010 Alaska Gubernatorial General Election graph of multiple polls from Pollster.com
Election 2010: Alaska Governor from Rasmussen Reports
2010 Alaska Governor Race from RealClearPolitics
Alaska Governor's Race from CQ Politics
Race Profile in The New York Times
Official campaign sites (archived)
 Ethan Berkowitz for Governor (D)
 Sean Parnell for Governor (R)

Governor
Alaska
2010